Katja Višnar (born 21 March 1984) is a Slovenian, former cross-country skier who competed between 2002 and 2020. At the 2010 Winter Olympics in Vancouver, she finished 11th in the team sprint, 15th in the 4 × 5 km relay, and 16th in the individual sprint events.

Višnar's best finish at the FIS Nordic World Ski Championships was second in the team sprint event at Seefeld in 2019 in pair with Anamarija Lampič.

Her best World Cup finish was second in a team sprint event in Russia in January 2010 and her best individual sprint finish was ninth at that same event. On 5 February 2011 she repeated her success at the World Cup finishing second in the sprint in Russia behind her compatriot Vesna Fabjan.

She announced her retirement from cross-country skiing in January 2020.

Cross-country skiing results
All results are sourced from the International Ski Federation (FIS).

Olympic Games

World Championships
1 medal – (1 silver)

World Cup

Season standings

Individual podiums
 3 podiums – (3 )

Team podiums
 1 podium – (1 )

References

External links

Katja Visnar at Sochi2014.com

Cross-country skiers at the 2010 Winter Olympics
Cross-country skiers at the 2014 Winter Olympics
Cross-country skiers at the 2018 Winter Olympics
1984 births
Living people
Olympic cross-country skiers of Slovenia
Slovenian female cross-country skiers
People from Bled
FIS Nordic World Ski Championships medalists in cross-country skiing